Kyoto City Gymnasium (京都市体育館, Kyoto-shi Taiikukan) is an arena in Kyoto, Kyoto, Japan. It is the home arena of the Kyoto Hannaryz of the B.League, Japan's professional basketball league.

References

External links
Arena Video

Basketball venues in Japan
Indoor arenas in Japan
Kyoto Hannaryz
Sports venues completed in 1963
Sports venues in Kyoto Prefecture
Buildings and structures in Kyoto

1963 establishments in Japan